An Evening with Herbie Hancock & Chick Corea: In Concert is a live album recorded over the course of several live performances in February 1978 and released that same year as a double LP. The album features just Herbie Hancock and Chick Corea playing acoustic piano.  The use of the acoustic instruments comes as a marked departure from both men's favoring of electric keyboards at that time. Herbie Hancock received top billing on this album, while Chick Corea was credited first on the album CoreaHancock, another recording from the same tour released by Polydor.

On vinyl, "February Moment" and its introduction are indexed as one track. Moreover, the liner notes state that the sound on the fourth side of the album had to be compressed in order to fit the 13 and a half minute version of "Maiden Voyage" and the nearly 22 minute version of "La Fiesta" on a single side; this preserved the integrity of the performance, but lowered the sound quality. The CD release avoids this issue.

Track listing

Side one
"Someday My Prince Will Come" (Frank Churchill, Larry Morey) – 12:36
"Liza (All the Clouds'll Roll Away)" (George Gershwin, Gus Kahn) – 8:56

Side two
"Button Up" (Corea, Hancock) – 17:33

Side three
"Introduction of Herbie Hancock by Chick Corea" – 0:41
"February Moment" (Hancock) – 15:50

Side four
"Maiden Voyage" (Hancock) – 13:30
"La Fiesta" (Corea) – 21:58

Personnel 
 Herbie Hancock – Piano, left channel 
 Chick Corea – Piano, right channel

Chart performance

References 

Instrumental duet albums
Chick Corea live albums
Collaborative albums
Herbie Hancock live albums
1978 live albums
Albums produced by Dave Rubinson
Columbia Records live albums